Priscilla is an upcoming American biographical film written and directed by Sofia Coppola. It is based on Priscilla Presley's memoir Elvis and Me, and follows her life and relationship with Elvis Presley. Cailee Spaeny and Jacob Elordi star as Priscilla and Elvis, respectively.

Plot
The film follows Priscilla Presley and her life with Elvis Presley.

Cast
Cailee Spaeny as Priscilla Presley
Jacob Elordi as Elvis Presley
Raine Monroe Boland as Lisa Marie Presley
Emily Mitchell as Lisa Marie Presley
Jorja Cadence as Patsy Presley
Rodrigo Fernandez-Stoll as Alan "Hog Ears" Fortas
Luke Humphrey as Terry West

Production

Development and casting 
On September 12, 2022, it was announced Sofia Coppola would direct an adaptation of Priscilla Presley's memoir Elvis and Me, starring Jacob Elordi as Elvis Presley and Cailee Spaeny as Priscilla Presley. When asked what made her want to adapt Priscilla's memoir for her next feature film, Coppola responded in an interview, "I've had her memoir for years and remember reading it a long time ago. A friend of mine was talking about her recently, and we got around to discussing the book. I read it again and was really moved by her story. I was supposed to start this big Edith Wharton project that was gonna take five months to shoot and felt really daunting. I came up against a few hurdles, so I just decided to pivot to making one film with one idea. I was just so interested in Priscilla's story and her perspective on what it all felt like to grow up as a teenager in Graceland. She was going through all the stages of young womanhood in such an amplified world—kinda similar to Marie Antoinette." 

When asked what made Cailee Spaeny the right choice to play Priscilla, Coppola stated, "The character goes from the age of 15 to 27 over the course of the film, so she had to be able to act and age across a big span of time. It was really important for me to have the same actress playing Priscilla at those different stages of her life, and I think Cailee can pull it off. She's such a strong actress, and she also looks very young." Of Jacob Elordi's casting as Elvis, Coppola stated, "I thought nobody was gonna look quite like Elvis, but Jacob has that same type of magnetism. He's so charismatic, and girls go crazy around him, so I knew he could pull off playing this type of romantic icon. But we're talking before we've even started filming, so I can't get too deep into it."

Coppola revealed in an interview that Priscilla Presley is an executive producer of Priscilla.

Filming 

Principal photography for Priscilla began in Toronto on October 24, 2022. Filming wrapped in early December.

References

External links
 

Upcoming films
American biographical films
American teen films
American Zoetrope films
Films about Elvis Presley
Films based on memoirs
Films directed by Sofia Coppola
Films shot in Toronto
Films with screenplays by Sofia Coppola
Priscilla Presley
Stage 6 Films films
Upcoming English-language films